
The ninth series of the British sitcom series 'Allo 'Allo! contains six episodes which first aired between 9 November and 14 December 1992.

Series 9 was the last series of the show, and contains the final regular episode (The Best of 'Allo 'Allo! aired some two years later; but was mostly made up of archive footage). Richard Gibson did not take part in the final series; so the character of Herr Otto Flick was taken over by David Janson.

The following episode names are the ones found on the British R2 DVDs with alternate region titles given below them.

Episodes

References

1992 British television seasons
 9
'Allo 'Allo! seasons